The Atsumi-class landing ship tank is a class of three tank landing ships (LSTs) that served with the Japanese Maritime Self-Defense Force (JMSDF) from 1972 to 2005. They were primarily deployed for logistic support but were also be used to carry heavy construction equipment such as trenchers.

Description
This gave them a maximum speed of 
.  

Vessels of the class carried two Landing Craft Vehicle Personnel (LCVPs). The LCVPs were slung under davits and a traveling gantry crane with folding rails that could be extended over the side handled the two LCMs positioned on the foredeck. The LSTs could carry up 130 troops. The Atsumi class were armed with twin-mounted  guns in a single turret placed each at the bow and stern. The LSTs were equipped with OPS-9 air search. They had a complement of 100 officers and crew.

Ships in the class

Service history
Three tank landing ships were ordered from Sasebo Heavy Industries and constructed in Sasebo, Japan. The first of the class, Atsumi entered service in 1972 with the Japanese Maritime Self Defense Force (JMSDF), with Motobu following in 1973 and Nemuro in 1977. Primarily used for logistic support.

Citations

References

 
 
 

Amphibious warfare vessels of the Japan Maritime Self-Defense Force
Tank landing ships
 
Amphibious warfare vessel classes